Events from the year 1620 in France.

Incumbents 
Monarch: Louis XIII

Events
 
 
 
 
 
 

 August 7 - Battle of Les Ponts-de-Cé, Poitou: French king Louis XIII defeats his mother Marie de' Medici.

Births
 

 
 February 15 – François Charpentier, French archaeologist and man of letters (d. 1702)
 April 17 – Marguerite Bourgeoys, French Catholic nun, founder of the Congregation of Notre Dame (d. 1700)
 July 21 – Jean Picard, French astronomer and priest (d. 1704)

Deaths

See also

References

1620s in France